In Japan,  are vehicles equipped with a public address system. They have been used notably in political and commercial contexts, and have one or more loudspeakers which can play a recorded message or recorded music as the truck tours through neighborhoods. In the political world, they are used by parties, candidates, and groups to express their views. In the early days of Japanese post-war democracy, they were one of the most common means of conducting political campaigns, alongside the likes of radio announcements and sponsored meetings. In a commercial context, vendors also use sound trucks for the purpose of selling goods, collecting recyclable materials, and other purposes.

Law 
The use of these sound trucks can be subject to so-called nuisance laws, although there have been instances in which police have been sympathetic to right-wing groups who utilise these trucks and have let such behaviour slide.

References
 

 
Politics of Japan
Advertising in Japan
Cars of Japan